Escambray is a ward and division in the municipality of Santa Clara, Villa Clara, Cuba.

Infrastructure

Infrastructural issues 
In Escambray the Carretera Central and the Circunvalacion Vieja has frequent clogging.

Economy 
Escambray has Villa Clara's Radiocuba's Territorial Division. The Joven Club Facility of Santa Clara III is also located in Escambray.

Education 
Schools in Escambray include:

 Fe del Valle School for Adults
 Fe del Valle Ramos Secondary School
 Osvaldo Socarrás Martínez Primary School
 Mi Reyecillo Preschool
 Nené Traviesa Preschool
 Que siempre brille el Sol Preschool
 Seguidores del Ché Preschool

Human resources

Public health 
Escambray has 2 hospitals, which include:
 Provincial Pediatric University Hospital "José Luis Miranda" 
 "Mariana Grajales" Provincial Gynecology-Obstetric Hospital

Escambray has one Optical, at Calle A e/ Ave. 26 de Julio y 7ma.

The Chiqui Gómez Polyclinic is in Escambray, being used by 46,733 people in the wards of Sakenaf, Vigía, Sandino, Escambray, Hospital, and Chambery.

Public essentials 
In Escambray there is one pharmacy being Farmacia Comunitaria Normal Urbana del Reparto Escambray.

Media 
Escambray has the Cine Rotonda, as stated on the building as the "Centro Cultural Cienmatographico" or "Science Cultural Center".

Sports 
The "Mártires de Barbados" in Sandino serves people from the wards of Sandino, Vigia, Escambray, and Manajanabo.

References

Populated places in Villa Clara Province